Electric Barnyard is the second studio album by the American country rock band the Kentucky Headhunters, released in 1991. It was their final album to feature the original lineup of Greg Martin, Doug Phelps, Ricky Lee Phelps, Fred Young, and Richard Young. Doug and Ricky Lee would depart a year later to form the duo Brother Phelps.

The album contains four covers: "Only Daddy That'll Walk the Line" (originally by Waylon Jennings), "With Body and Soul" (originally by Bill Monroe), "Spirit in the Sky" (originally by Norman Greenbaum) and "The Ballad of Davy Crockett", a 1950s pop standard. "Only Daddy That'll Walk the Line" earned the band a Grammy Award nomination for Best Country Performance by a Duo or Group with Vocal in 1993; the album was nominated for the same award in 1992.

Track listing

Personnel
The Kentucky Headhunters
Greg Martin – electric guitar, slide guitar
Doug Phelps – bass guitar, background vocals
Ricky Lee Phelps – lead vocals, harmonica, percussion
Fred Young – drums, percussion
Richard Young – rhythm guitar

Charts

Weekly charts

Year-end charts

References

1991 albums
The Kentucky Headhunters albums
Mercury Nashville albums